The Lezgic languages are one of seven branches of the Northeast Caucasian language family. Lezgin and Tabasaran are literary languages.

Classification

 Peripheral: Archi – 970 speakers
 Samur (Nuclear Lezgic)
 Eastern Samur
Udi – 6,600 speakers
 Lezgin–Aghul–Tabasaran
Lezgian – 630,000 speakers
 Aghul – 29,300 speakers
 Tabasaran – 126,900 speakers
 Southern Samur
Kryts – 5,000
 Budukh – 200 speakers
 Western Samur
Rutul – 36,400 speakers
 Tsakhur – 22,300 speakers

The voicing of ejective consonants
The Lezgic languages are relevant to the glottalic theory of Indo-European, because several have undergone the voicing of ejectives that have been postulated but widely derided as improbable in that family. The correspondences have not been well worked out (Rutul is inconsistent in the examples), but a few examples are:

Non-Lezgic: Avar ; Lezgic: Rutul , Tsakhur  'name'
Non-Lezgic: Archi , Lak ; Lezgic: Rutul , Tabassaran , Aɡul  'beard'
Non-Lezgic: Avar ; Lezgic: Tabassaran  'moon'

A similar change has taken place in non-initial position in the Nakh languages.

See also 
 Languages of the Caucasus
 Northeast Caucasian languages

References

External links
 Lezgic basic lexica at the Global Lexicostatistical Database

Lezgian languages
Northeast Caucasian languages
Languages of Azerbaijan
Languages of Russia

tr:Lezgice